Knaresborough is a market and spa town and civil parish in the Borough of Harrogate, in North Yorkshire, England, on the River Nidd.

History

Knaresborough is mentioned in the Domesday Book of 1086 as Chenaresburg, meaning "Cenheard's fortress", in the wapentake of Burghshire, renamed Claro Wapentake in the 12th century. Knaresborough Castle is Norman; around 1100, the town began to grow. It provided a market and attracted traders to service the castle. The parish church, St John's, was established around this time. The earliest identified Lord of Knaresborough is around 1115 when Serlo de Burgh held the Honour of Knaresborough from the King.

Hugh de Morville was granted the Honour of Knaresborough in 1158. He was constable of Knaresborough and leader of the group of four knights who murdered Archbishop Thomas Becket at Canterbury Cathedral on 29 December 1170. The four knights fled to Knaresborough and hid at the castle. Hugh de Morville forfeited the lands in 1173, not for his implication in the murder of Thomas Becket, but for "complicity in the rebellion of Henry the Young King", according to the Early Yorkshire Charters.

The Honour of Knaresborough then passed to the Stuteville family. When the Stuteville line was broken with the death of Robert the 4th (son of Robert 3rd) in 1205, King John effectively took the Honour of Knaresborough for himself. The first Maundy Money was distributed in Knaresborough by King John on 15 April 1210. Knaresborough Forest, which extended far to the south of the town, is reputed to have been one of King John's favourite hunting grounds.

Although a market was first mentioned in 1206, the town was not granted a Royal Charter to hold a market until 1310, by Edward II. A market is still held every Wednesday in the market square. In Edward II's reign, the castle was occupied by rebels and the curtain walls were breached by a siege engine. Later, Scots invaders burned much of the town and the parish church. In 1328, as part of the marriage settlement, Queen Philippa was granted "the Castle, Town, Forest and Honour of Knaresborough" by Edward III and the parish church was restored. After her death in 1369, the Honour was granted by Edward to their younger son, John of Gaunt, the Duke of Lancaster and since then the castle has belonged to the Duchy of Lancaster. After the accession of Henry IV the castle lost much of its importance in national affairs, but remained a key site in regional administration for another century.

In the English Civil War, following the Battle of Marston Moor in 1644, the castle was besieged by Parliamentary forces. The castle eventually fell and in 1646 an order was made by Parliament for its destruction (but not carried out till 1648). The destruction was mainly done by citizens looting the stone. Many town centre buildings are built of castle stone.

The railway age began in Knaresborough in 1848 with the opening of a railway station on Hay Park Lane; this was replaced with the current one three years later in 1851.  The town had a railway line to Boroughbridge until it closed to passengers in 1950; it was dismantled in 1964.

Historically in the West Riding of Yorkshire, Knaresborough became part of North Yorkshire in 1974.

Culture and community

Knaresborough House on the High Street houses Knaresborough Town Council and the Yorkshire Federation of Young Farmers' Clubs.

Knaresborough hosts the annual Bed Race, organised by the Knaresborough Lions Club. It is held on the second Saturday of June. The event was first staged in 1966.

An annual town centre arts summer festival, the Festival of Entertainment and Visual Arts, has run since 2001.

Knaresborough hosts a parkrun, Conyngham Hall parkrun, which started in May 2019.  It takes place every Saturday at Conyngham Hall, with the exception of Bed Race day.

The town was used in the opening election sequence in the first episode of the ITV comedy series The New Statesman and some exterior shots for the series were filmed around Knaresborough. The town also featured in the 2019 American television film A Very British Christmas, for which it was a principal shooting location.

The Frazer Theatre is just off High Street.

Landmarks
Sights in the town include the remains of Knaresborough Castle, the Courthouse Museum in the castle grounds, Mother Shipton's Cave, the House in the Rock, St Robert's Cave (dating from the Middle Ages), and the railway viaduct over the River Nidd.

The House in the Rock, also known as Fort Montague, is a local Knaresborough curiosity. In the early 19th century, a strange child appeared in the Hill family. This child had abnormal very blonde woolly hair resembling the fleece of a sheep and was known as the Woolly-Headed Boy of Fort Montague. He conducted visitors around the house and was a great curiosity himself.

The Chapel of Our Lady of the Crag on Abbey Road is a Grade I listed shrine dedicated to the Virgin Mary. It was built in 1408 by John the Mason after his son, who was presumed dead in a rockfall in a local quarry, was found alive, with the son's escape having been attributed to the mason's frequent prayers to Mary.

Knaresborough is the site of the oldest chemist shop in England, opened in 1720.

The principal areas of public open space are the Knaresborough Castle grounds, Horseshoe Field, the King George V Playing Field and Jacob Smith Park, a  parkland on the edge of the town, bequeathed to Knaresborough by Miss Winifred Jacob Smith in 2003. Wildlife is protected in the former flooded quarry, Hay-a-Park Gravel Pit.

Conyngham Hall is close to the town centre. Until the 1980s there was a small zoo in the grounds.

Near to the castle are Bebra Gardens, formerly the Moat Gardens, renamed after Knaresborough's twin town in Germany.

The Commercial (formerly Borough Bailiff) public house, owned by the Samuel Smith Brewery, is the oldest pub in Knaresborough.

Amenities and commerce

The town has a large supermarket, Lidl, which is located on the site of a former Co-Op store in Chain Lane, as well as smaller supermarkets in the town centre. The St James retail park on the outskirts of the town, off Wetherby Road, has retail chain units. The town has fifteen public houses, a wine bar, two working men's clubs and several restaurants. There are a number of national retailers with branches in the town centre, mostly around the High Street, Market Place and Castle Courtyard (a shopping arcade in the old Town Hall). The town has a small public swimming pool.

Transport

Knaresborough is served by Knaresborough railway station, on the Harrogate Line between Leeds and York. It is also served by Transdev and Connexions who both run buses in the area that centre around Knaresborough bus station on the High Street. The closest airport is Leeds Bradford Airport with bus links from neighbouring Harrogate.

Economy
Knaresborough is mostly a commuter town but it also serves as a local centre for the surrounding rural villages.  The town has a small tourism industry and service sector.  There is a small industrial estate on Manse Lane in the east of the town. Knaresborough has a local weekly newspaper; the Knaresborough Post, although it borrows content heavily from neighbouring publications. Flying Colours Flagmakers, who hold a Royal Warrant to supply flags to the Royal Household, are based in Knaresborough.

Religion

The town has two Church of England churches, a Roman Catholic church, St. Mary's, and Methodist and United Reformed churches.

Knaresborough Primitive Methodist Chapel on High Street was built in the 1850s. The date of closure is not known; a plaque on the building states that it was built in 1851 but there is some debate about this. The chapel premises were used by a coat manufacturer for a good part of the 20th century. In 2001 the premises were converted into four flats. 

Ecumenical services take place at Our Lady of the Crag Shrine (1408).

A plaque in Market Place, placed by the Knaresborough Civic Society, commemorates the 13th century Synagogue to the rear of the Market Place. The plaque indicates that in the 13th century a Jewish community lived and worshipped in Knaresborough. The synagogue was situated at the exit to Synagogue Lane, the exact location of which is unknown. It is believed the Knaresborough Jewish community was dissolved in 1275, before people of the Jewish faith were expelled from England in 1290  on the orders of Edward 1.

Education
Knaresborough has five primary schools and one secondary school; King James' School.  There is a further education college in nearby Harrogate and universities in Leeds and York.  The town has a two-storey library on the Market Place.

Sport
Knaresborough Town F.C. is based at Manse Lane; they play in the Northern Counties East League Division 1. Youth football is catered for by Knaresborough Celtic with junior teams from Under 6s to Under 17s. Scotton Scorchers offer youth football for boys from the under 6s to under 12s and girls to under 17's. Knaresborough Town are developing youth football.

Knaresborough Rugby Club play in the Yorkshire Leagues. The club was formed in 1982 and play at their Hay-a-park ground which opened in 2014.  Unusually for a Yorkshire town, there is no rugby league club, the closest being in Wetherby.

The town has two cricket clubs. Knaresborough Forest Cricket Club were Nidderdale League Division 3 winners in 2005, afterwards promoted from Division 2 as runners-up in the following season. Knaresborough Cricket Club have a ground on Aspin Lane, where adult teams play in the Airedale & Wharfedale Senior Cricket League and junior teams play in the Nidderdale Junior Cricket League.

On 6 July 2014, Stage 2 of the 2014 Tour de France from York to Sheffield, passed through the town.

Each June, there is a famous bed race at Knaresborough.

Notable people

 William de Vesci (ca.1125 – 1184), Anglo-Norman feudal lord, born at Knaresborough Castle 
 St. Robert (ca.1160–1218), 12th-century hermit whose cave is near the River Nidd
 Ursula Southeil (ca.1488–1561), known as Mother Shipton, a medieval seer, may have been born in a cave south of the town.
 Robert Byerley (1660–1714), soldier and politician, lived at Goldsborough Hall 
 Eugene Aram (1704-1759), scholar and murderer lived here.
 John Metcalf (1717–1810), known as "Blind Jack", lost his sight in childhood; a violin player, local guide, bridgebuilder and roadmaker.
 John Walton (1784–1862), entomologist 
 William Hargrove (1788–1862), historian of York, owner of the York Herald
 Richard Popplewell Pullan (1825-1888), architect, discovered the Lion of Knidos.
 William Stubbs (1825–1901), English historian and Anglican bishop.
 Charles Farrar Forster (1848–1894), the first vicar of Beckwithshaw Church.
 Squadron Leader James Harry Lacey, DFM & Bar (1917–1989), WWII RAF fighter pilot, attended school in Knaresborough.
 Robert Aagaard (1932–2001), local  furniture maker, founded the youth movement Cathedral Camps
 Gorden Kaye (1941–2017), actor and singer, best known for playing René Artois in the British comedy series 'Allo 'Allo!.
 Grant Kirkhope (born 1962), musician and composer best known for his work with Rareware, was raised here and attended King James's School.
 Tim Kellett (born 1964), trumpeter and keyboardist from Simply Red and Olive
 Bill Callahan (born 1966), American singer-songwriter and guitarist
 The Paul Mirfin Band (formed in 2015), a local folk rock band

Sport 
 Jonathan Joy (1826–1889) first-class cricketer 
 Francis Prentice (1912–1978), first-class cricketer who played 241 matches
 Darren Manning (born 1975), motor racing driver 
 Dan Linfoot (born 1988), former Grand Prix motorcycle road racer now competing in the British Superbike Championship
 Greg Minikin (born 1995), rugby league footballer with 173 caps

Geography

References

External links

Video footage of the House in the Rock
Chapel of Our Lady of the Crag
St Robert's Cave and Chapel
 
 English Heritage, Aerial Photo Explorer (Enter "Knaresborough" in search box)

 
Market towns in North Yorkshire
Civil parishes in North Yorkshire
Nidderdale
Spa towns in England
Towns in North Yorkshire